Christopher Townsend is a visual effects supervisor. He has worked in the visual effects industry for over 20 years. For over a decade, he was an artist and supervisor at Industrial Light and Magic, and in 2007 became a freelance visual effects supervisor. He worked on Journey to the Center of the Earth, the first ever stereoscopic motion picture shot and released digitally, The Wolverine, Ninja Assassin, Percy Jackson & the Olympians: The Lightning Thief and Captain America: The First Avenger. He was nominated for a BAFTA and an Academy Award for Best Visual Effects for his work on Iron Man 3, oversaw nearly 3000 shots on Avengers: Age of Ultron and was the overall supervisor for Guardians of the Galaxy Vol. 2 as well as Captain Marvel. In 2015 he was given an Honorary Doctor of Arts degree by his alma mater, Coventry University.

References

External links

Visual effects artists
Living people
Year of birth missing (living people)
Alumni of Coventry University
Nationality missing